Ingleside is a suburb in Northern Sydney, in the state of New South Wales, Australia. Ingleside is located 28 kilometres north of the Sydney central business district, in the local government area of Northern Beaches Council.  Ingleside is part of the Forest District region, about 2 kilometres from the coast at Mona Vale. Ingleside Heights and Tumbledown Dick are localities in the west of the suburb.

The area is mostly semi-rural properties and bushland with increasing housing developments.

History
The suburb takes its name from a mansion in the area called Ingleside House, built in the 1880s by Baron Von Beirenm, an industrial chemist of Dutch and American background. He specialised in gunpowder and explosives, founding a factory called the Australian Gunpowder and Explosives Manufacturing Company. Powder Works Road takes its name from this factory.

Population
In the 2016 Census, there were 974 people in Ingleside. 74.7% of people were born in Australia and 81.1% of people spoke only English at home. The most common responses for religion were Catholic 29.4%, No Religion 26.0% and Anglican 15.8%.

Landmarks
 The Sydney Baháʼí Temple, the world's fourth Baháʼí House of Worship, was completed in 1961.
 The Smoky Dawson Ranch was the home of one of Australia's most popular country music singers. The former ranch was sold to the HASG Armenian School. In 2002 the school opened a commemorative Smoky Dawson ranch-style gate, which has become a tourist attraction.
 DoggieRescue.com, an animal rescue and re-homing shelter started by Monika Biernacki.

Schools
 Hamazkaine A&S Galstaun College (Armenian Private College)

References

External links
  [CC-By-SA]

Suburbs of Sydney
Northern Beaches Council